Lipina may refer to places:

Czech Republic
Lipina (Olomouc District), a municipality and village

Poland
Lipina, Łódź Voivodeship, a village in central Poland
Lipina, Lublin Voivodeship, a village in east Poland
Lipina, Podlaskie Voivodeship, a village in northeast Poland
Lipina, Warmian-Masurian Voivodeship, a village in north Poland